Ian Martin may refer to:

 Ian Martin (UN official), English human rights activist and United Nations official
 Ian Martin (writer) (born 1953), British comedy writer
 Ian Martin (rugby league), Australian rugby league footballer
 Ian Kennedy Martin (born 1936), British television scriptwriter
 Ian Martin (actor), American actor and writer

See also
 Iain Martin, Scottish political journalist